Aceh State Museum, popularly known as Aceh Museum or Banda Aceh Museum is a museum in Banda Aceh, Indonesia. It is one of the oldest museum in Indonesia.

History

Colonial period

The original building of the Aceh Museum was in the form of a traditional Acehnese stage house (Acehnese Rumoh Aceh). This building was originally used as the Aceh Pavilion in the ground of De Koloniale Tentoonsteling (The Colonial Exhibition) in Semarang from August 13 to November 15, 1914. The original intention was that the stage house would be dismantled and moved to the Netherlands.

The pavilion showcased Acehnese artefacts, most of them are private collection of the ethnographer , which in 1915 became the first curator of the Museum of Aceh. During this exhibition, Aceh Pavilion managed to become the best pavilion. Because of this success, Stammeshaus proposed the Civic and Military Governor of Aceh, to bring the pavilion back to Aceh and used it as a museum.

The building was returned to Koetaradja (now Banda Aceh) in Aceh, and since August 31, 1915, it was officially opened on the Esplanade of Koetaradja with Stammeshaus as the first curator of the museum. Stammeshaus remained a curator of the museum until 1933.

After his retirement, Stammeshaus sold his personal collection of 1,300 ethnographic objects to the Colonial Institute in Amsterdam, now the Tropenmuseum. In this collection were many highlights of Aceh artefacts, including gold jewellery, Acehnese weapons, amulets, photographs and everyday utensils. The most famous sold to the Tropenmuseum is the personal coat of Teuku Umar.

Post-independence period

After the independence of Indonesia, the museum became the property of the Regional Government of Aceh. In 1969, under the initiative of Teuku Hamzah Bendahara, the Aceh Museum was moved from the old place (Blang Padang) to its present location in Jalan Sultan Alaidin Mahmudsyan on a 10,800 m2 land.

In 1974, the museum received a fund to rehabilitate the museum. The fund was used to restore the original pavilion building and to construct a new building for the museum complex. This new building contains room for permanent exhibition, a conference hall, a laboratory, a library, and an office. The fund was also used to add the collection for the museum and for related research.

On September 1, 1980, Aceh Museum was officially made a provincial museum under the name Aceh State Museum (Indonesian Museum Negeri Aceh). The official inauguration was made by the Minister of Education and Culture at that time, Dr. Daoed Yoesoef.

The historic Rumoh Aceh has survived from the 2004 earthquake and tsunami.

Rumoh Aceh
The Rumoh Aceh is a typical Acehnese traditional stage house with wood as main material. The house contains three rooms, the front room (Ruang Depan), the middle room (Tungai) and the back room (Seuramo Likot). The middle room is about 50–75 cm higher than the back and front room.

Collection
Some of the original collection of the Aceh Museum has been maintained by the Tropenmuseum in Amsterdam, some of the most famous of this is the personal coat of Teuku Umar.

Today the museum collects Acehnese related archaeological items, flora and fauna from Aceh, ethnographic items, old manuscripts, stones and minerals from the region, Acehnese ceramic, coins and seal from the kingdom of Aceh, and historic paintings.

See also 
List of colonial buildings and structures in Jakarta
List of museums and cultural institutions in Indonesia

References 

1915 establishments in the Dutch East Indies
Museums established in 1915
Ethnographic museums in Indonesia
Museums in Aceh
Buildings and structures in Banda Aceh
World's fair architecture in Asia